Pterolichidae is a family of mites belonging to the order Sarcoptiformes.

Genera 

Genera:
 Aegothelichus Atyeo, 1979
 Afrolichus Gaud & Atyeo, 1996
 Ambodrilus Gaud & Atyeo, 1996

References 

Acari